Barik Ab (also Romanized as Bārīk Āb; also known as Barkab) is a village in Aq Bolagh Rural District, Sojas Rud District, Khodabandeh County, Zanjan Province, Iran. At the 2006 census, its population was 190, in 40 families.

References 

Populated places in Khodabandeh County